Pauline Louise Hammarlund (born 7 May 1994) is a Swedish football striker currently playing for Fiorentina in the Italian Serie A. She played previously for Linköpings FC, Piteå IF and BK Häcken.

International career
Hammarlund made her debut for the senior Sweden team in a 3–0 UEFA Women's Euro 2017 qualifying win over Moldova on 17 September 2015, in which she also scored her first international goal.

International goals

References

External links

1994 births
Living people
Swedish women's footballers
Tyresö FF players
Damallsvenskan players
Linköpings FC players
Sweden women's international footballers
Piteå IF (women) players
BK Häcken FF players
Fiorentina Women's F.C. players
Footballers from Stockholm
Women's association football forwards
Medalists at the 2016 Summer Olympics
Olympic silver medalists for Sweden
Olympic medalists in football
Footballers at the 2016 Summer Olympics
Olympic footballers of Sweden
Skogås-Trångsunds FF players
UEFA Women's Euro 2017 players